Mexicana Universal Aguascalientes (until 2016 called Nuestra Belleza Aguascalientes) is a pageant in Aguascalientes, Mexico, that selects that state's representative for the national Mexicana Universal pageant (before called Nuestra Belleza México).

The State Organization has produced two winners for Miss Universe in 2011 and 2014, two winners for Miss International in 2010 and 2013 and one winner for Miss World in 2010 with Gabriela Palacio who was successor as Nuestra Belleza Mundo México after dethroned of Cynthia de la Vega, she being the first and only woman from the state to win two crowns of Nuestra Belleza México. 

Mexicana Universal Aguascalientes is located at number 5 with six crowns of Nuestra Belleza México/Mexicana Universal.

Titleholders
Below are the names of the annual titleholders of Mexicana Universal Aguascalientes, listed in ascending order, and their final placements in the Mexicana Universal after their participation, until 2017 the names are as Nuestra Belleza Aguascalientes.

 Competed in Miss Universe.
 Competed in Miss International.
 Competed in Miss Charm International.
 Competed in Miss Continente Americano.
 Competed in Reina Hispanoamericana.
 Competed in Miss Orb International.
 Competed in Nuestra Latinoamericana Universal.

Designated Contestants
As of 2000, isn't uncommon for some States to have more than one delegate competing simultaneously in the national pageant. The following Nuestra Belleza Aguascalientes contestants were invited to compete in Nuestra Belleza México. Some have placed higher than the actual State winners.

 Competed in Miss International.

External links
Official Website

Nuestra Belleza México